Ocean's Thirteen (stylized as Ocean's 13) is a 2007 American heist comedy film directed by Steven Soderbergh and written by Brian Koppelman and David Levien. It is the final installment in the Ocean's film trilogy and the sequel to Ocean's Twelve (2004). The film features an ensemble cast including George Clooney, Brad Pitt, Matt Damon, Andy García, Don Cheadle, Bernie Mac, Ellen Barkin, Al Pacino, Casey Affleck, Scott Caan, Eddie Jemison, Shaobo Qin, Carl Reiner, and Elliott Gould.

Filming began in July 2006 in Las Vegas and Los Angeles. The film was screened as an Out of Competition presentation at the 2007 Cannes Film Festival on May 24, 2007, and was released theatrically in the United States on June 8, by Warner Bros. Pictures. The film received generally positive reviews from critics and grossed $311.7 million worldwide.

Plot 
Reuben Tishkoff builds a hotel-casino on the Las Vegas Strip; against advice from his friend and erstwhile criminal partner, Danny Ocean, he involves himself with investor and casino mogul Willy Bank, whose thugs strongarm Reuben into signing over his ownership stake. 

Tishkoff suffers a heart attack and becomes bedridden. Ocean offers Bank a chance to set things right, given his long history in Las Vegas and the fact that he "shook Sinatra's hand", but Bank refuses and completes construction of the hotel, renamed "The Bank". To avenge Tishkoff, Ocean gathers his crew and plans to ruin Bank on the opening night of the hotel.

The crew's plan has two objectives:

 Prevent The Bank from winning the prestigious Five Diamond Award, which all of his previous hotels have won. Saul Bloom acts as the anonymous Five Diamond reviewer, while the real one is treated horribly.
 Rig all of the casino's games to pay out millions in winnings; Bank's casino has to make $500 million in the first quarter in order to stay open, otherwise he would lose control of his corporation to a hostile faction of its board of directors. 

While they can implement various rigging mechanisms into the casino, Danny and his crew would be stopped by the Greco, a state-of-the-art computer system that monitors the gamblers' biometric responses and detects cheating.

To disrupt the Greco, they plan to use a magnetron disguised as a cell phone as a gift to Bank. They also obtain the drilling machine used to bore the Channel Tunnel to simulate an earthquake under the casino, ensuring evacuation of the premises. Their plan on opening night is to have Bank inadvertently disrupt the Greco by using his new phone, initiate their rigged machines as well as dealers on their payroll, and then simulate the earthquake to force the evacuation so players leave with their winnings.

Shortly before opening night, the drill breaks down. The team is forced to ask Terry Benedict, their previous target, for funds to buy a replacement. He offers the funds for a portion of the take as he dislikes Bank, and demands they steal Bank's private diamond collection in celebration of his Five Diamond Awards. 

The jewels are secured in a case at the top of the casino. So, Ocean has Linus Caldwell seduce Bank's assistant, Abigail Sponder, to gain access to the case. Secretly, Benedict contracts master thief François "The Night Fox" Toulour to intercept the diamonds.

Ocean institutes the final part of the plan by having FBI agents on his payroll arrive at the hotel and arrest Livingston Dell on suspicion of rigging the card-shuffling machines, allowing them to be replaced with actual rigged ones. Another FBI agent arrests Linus for switching the diamonds with fakes. The agent takes Linus away and he turns out to be his father Robert, whom Ocean enlisted. 

Trying to evacuate from the roof, they are intercepted by Toulour. He takes the diamonds and parachutes off the roof after tricking Linus with an unloaded pistol. However, Ocean anticipated this and never had Linus make the switch. Linus and his father escape in a helicopter piloted by Basher, tearing the case of diamonds off the roof.

The earthquake is triggered and the players evacuate with millions of dollars in winnings. Ocean tells Bank he is the mastermind behind everything and that they did it for Reuben. He reminds him that he cannot get revenge, since Danny knows all of Bank's associates and they prefer him over Bank. He cannot go to the police either due to Bank's illegal activities. 

With their share of the winnings, Ocean's crew buy property on the Strip for Reuben to build his own casino. Ocean donates Benedict's $72 million portion of the take to charity in Benedict's name, forcing him to admit his philanthropy on The Oprah Winfrey Show.

Ocean, Rusty, and Linus say their goodbyes at the airport. Before he boards his flight, Rusty gives his last coin to the real Five Diamond reviewer to play on a slot machine in the terminal. The reviewer, unaware that the slot machine is rigged, wins $11 million and publicly celebrates his winnings as Rusty walks away grinning.

Cast

The Thirteen

 George Clooney as Danny Ocean, an ex-con that comes up with a new heist involving The Bank.
 Brad Pitt as Rusty Ryan
 Matt Damon as Linus Caldwell
 Andy García as Terry Benedict
 Don Cheadle as Basher Tarr
 Bernie Mac as Frank Catton
 Elliott Gould as Reuben Tishkoff, Danny's friend who plans to make a new casino until he gets swindled by Willy.
 Casey Affleck as Virgil Malloy
 Scott Caan as Turk Malloy
 Eddie Jemison as Livingston Dell
 Qin Shaobo as "The Amazing" Yen
 Carl Reiner as Saul Bloom
 Eddie Izzard as Roman Nagel, a master thief and friend of Danny who is brought in as a consultant.

Others
 Al Pacino as Willy Bank, a casino mogul who swindles Reuben of his money to further his hotel called The Bank.
 Ellen Barkin as Abigail Sponder, Willy's personal assistant.
 Vincent Cassel as François Toulour / The Night Fox, a master thief who Benedict hires to beat Danny to Bank's diamonds.
 Bob Einstein as Robert "Bobby" Caldwell, a legendary con artist and the father of Linus that was mentioned a lot in the first two movies who poses as an FBI agent.
 Olga Sosnovska as Debbie, the concierge at The Bank.
 David Paymer as the "V.U.P.", a Five Diamond reviewer who falls victim to the shenanigans of Danny's group.
 Angel Oquendo as Guard Ortega
 Julian Sands as Greco Montgomery
 Jerry Weintraub as Denny Shields

Production 
In January 2006, it was reported that producers were in discussions about setting and shooting most of the film at the Wynn Las Vegas. Clooney had previously hoped to film it at his then-upcoming Las Ramblas Resort in Las Vegas, although the project would not have been ready in time for production. In March 2006, it was reported that the film would be shot in a fake casino that would be constructed on five Warner Bros. sound stages. Filming was expected to begin in Las Vegas and Los Angeles in July 2006. Al Pacino joined the cast in April 2006.

Location scouting took place in Las Vegas in mid-July 2006, with the Bellagio confirmed as a filming location, which was also used for scenes in Ocean's Eleven. Filming in Las Vegas began on August 7, 2006, with scenes shot at McCarran International Airport and at a heliport. The following day, filming moved to the Palazzo resort, which was under construction at the time. Filming in Las Vegas concluded on August 9, 2006, after scenes involving Clooney, Pitt, Damon, and García were shot in an office at the back of the Bellagio. At that time, Clooney and producer Jerry Weintraub were considering premiering the film in Las Vegas. Another Las Vegas shoot was scheduled for September 2006, including additional filming at the Bellagio.

Julia Roberts and Catherine Zeta-Jones did not appear in their respective roles as Tess Ocean and Isabel Lahiri, due to the actresses not wanting to participate in the movie without a significant part in the plot, which the script would not accommodate. This is referenced early in the movie when Ocean mentions it's 'not their fight' when questioned as to their absence by others in the group. Topher Grace, who cameoed in the previous two films as a heavily fictionalized version of himself, was unable to return due to reshoots on Spider-Man 3: he recalls that his planned cameo would have involved him having a conversation with Rusty while holding an Asian baby and never addressing where the baby came from.

Reception

Box office 
The film did well on its first weekend, reaching the top spot at the North American box office. Despite opening in 250 more theaters than Ocean's Twelve, it had a slightly weaker opening weekend than the former, pulling in $36 million, compared with Twelve $39 million. Ocean's Thirteen had generated $117.1 million in box office domestically, and $311.7 million worldwide.

Critical reception
The website's critical consensus reads, "Ocean's Thirteen reverts to the formula of the first installment, and the result is another slick and entertaining heist film." On Metacritic, the film has a weighted average score of 62 out of 100, based on 37 critics, indicating "generally favorable reviews". Audiences polled by CinemaScore gave the film an average grade of "B+" on an A+ to F scale.

In his review for New York, David Edelstein wrote, "As the plotting gets knottier, [Soderbergh]'s technique gets more fluid—the editing jazzier, the colors more luscious, the whip-pans more whizbang. It's all anchored by Clooney, looking impudent, roguish, almost laughably handsome." Manohla Dargis, in her review for The New York Times, wrote, "Playing inside the box and out, [Soderbergh] has learned to go against the grain while also going with the flow. In Ocean's Thirteen he proves that in spades by using color like Kandinsky and hanging a funny mustache on Mr. Clooney's luscious mug, having become a genius of the system he so often resists."

In his review for the Chicago Sun-Times, Roger Ebert gave the film two and a half stars out of four, writing "Ocean's Thirteen proceeds with insouciant dialogue, studied casualness, and a lotta stuff happening, none of which I cared much about because the movie doesn't pause to develop the characters, who are forced to make do with their movie-star personas." Peter Bradshaw, in his review for The Guardian, wrote, "Sometimes we go to split-screen, and sometimes — whooaaa! — two of the split-screen frames are funkily showing the same thing. It is all quite meaningless. As if in an experimental novel by B. S. Johnson, the scenes could be reshuffled and shown in any order and it would amount to the same thing. There is no human motivation and no romance."

Home video release
Ocean's Thirteen was released on DVD and Blu-ray in November 2007.

Future

Possible sequel
A sequel to Ocean's Thirteen had been discussed as a possibility, up until the death of Bernie Mac. However, in June 2021, Don Cheadle revealed that Steven Soderbergh had been working on the concept of a sequel film. In July of the same year, Matt Damon also expressed interest in returning to the franchise, while stating that the project is up to Soderbergh.

Spin-off

Ocean's 8, a spin-off of the Ocean's Trilogy films, was directed by Gary Ross and released in 2018. Sandra Bullock starred as Debbie Ocean, Danny Ocean's sister, opposite Cate Blanchett, Helena Bonham Carter, Anne Hathaway, Rihanna Fenty, Sarah Paulson, Mindy Kaling, and Nora "Awkwafina" Lum, as a team who takes part in a heist at the Met Gala.

See also
 List of films set in Las Vegas

References

External links

 
 
 
 

2007 films
2000s crime thriller films
2000s crime comedy films
2000s heist films
American sequel films
American crime comedy films
American heist films
American films about revenge
Films directed by Steven Soderbergh
Films set in the Las Vegas Valley
Films about gambling
Films based on works by George Clayton Johnson
Thirteen
Warner Bros. films
Village Roadshow Pictures films
2007 comedy films
Films scored by David Holmes (musician)
2000s English-language films
2000s American films